
Year 749 (DCCXLIX) was a common year starting on Wednesday (link will display the full calendar) of the Julian calendar. The denomination 749 for this year has been used since the early medieval period, when the Anno Domini calendar era became the prevalent method in Europe for naming years.

Events 
 By place 
 Europe 
 King Ratchis of the Lombards besieges Perugia, but is convinced to lift the siege by Pope Zachary. His decision to lift the siege of Perugia undermines his authority among the Lombard nobility, and ultimately results in the nobility deposing him at a council in Milan. King Ratchis is forced to retire with his family to the monastery at Monte Cassino.
 June – Aistulf succeeds his brother, Ratchis, as king of the Lombards and marries Gisaltruda, sister of Anselm, Duke of Friuli.

 Britain 
 King Ælfwald of East Anglia dies after a 36-year reign. He is succeeded by Beonna, Æthelberht I and possibly Hun (relationship unknown). Beonna emerges as the dominant monarch. 
 King Æthelbald of Mercia calls the Synod of Gumley, at the instigation of Boniface, bishop of Mainz, and issues a charter that releases the Catholic Church from all public burdens.

 Arabian Empire 
 Abbasid Revolution: Muslim forces under Qahtaba ibn Shabib al-Ta'i defeat a large Umayyad army (50,000 men) at Isfahan, and invade Iraq, taking the city of Kufa.
 Abdallah ibn Abd al-Malik, Umayyad prince, is executed by crucifixion on orders of the first Abbasid caliph, Abdullah ibn Muhammad, at Al-Hirah (or 750).
 October 28 – Abdullah ibn Muhammad is proclaimed caliph at Kufa by his supporters and adopts the title of al-Saffah (the "Slaughterer of Blood").

 Central America 
February 18 – Kʼakʼ Yipyaj Chan Kʼawiil ("Smoke Squirrel") becomes the new ruler of the Mayan city state of Copán in Honduras upon the death of Kʼakʼ Tiliw Chan Yopaat, who had reigned since 738.  K'ak' Yipyaj reigns until 763. 

 Japan 
 August 19 – Emperor Shōmu abdicates the throne, after a 25-year reign that has been dominated by his wife (and aunt), Kōmyō, a commoner he married at age 16. He is succeeded by his daughter Kōken; Shōmu becomes the first retired emperor to become a Buddhist priest.

 By topic 

 Catastrophe 
 January 18 – Galilee earthquake: Palestine and eastern Transjordan are devastated by an earthquake. The cities of Tiberias, Beit She'an, Hippos and Pella are largely destroyed.

Births 
 Muhammad al-Shaybani, Muslim jurist (approximate date)

Deaths 
 August 27 – Qahtaba ibn Shabib al-Ta'i, Muslim general
 December 4 – John of Damascus, Syrian monk and priest
 Ælfwald, king of East Anglia
 Abdallah ibn Abd al-Malik, Umayyad prince (or 750)
 Ailello hui Daimine, king of Uí Maine (Ireland)
 Gyōki, Japanese Buddhist priest (b. 668)

References